The mountain firetail (Oreostruthus fuliginosus) is a common species of estrildid finch found in New Guinea. It has an estimated global extent of occurrence of 20,000-50,000 km2. It is the only species in the genus Oreostruthus.

It is commonly found in subtropical or tropical dry forest. The IUCN has classified the species as being of least concern.

References

External links
BirdLife International species factsheet

mountain firetail
Birds of New Guinea
mountain firetail